Elizabeth Kelly is a British actress.

Elizabeth Kelly may also refer to:
Elizabeth Kelly (artist), New Zealand artist
Elizabeth J. Kelly, American statistician
Liz Tilberis (1947–1999; née Elizabeth Kelly), British fashion magazine editor
Elizabeth Kelly (EastEnders)
Betty Kelly (born 1944), American singer
Liz Kelly (born 1951), British academic, abuse studies
Lizzie Kelly (born 1993), British jockey